Ermir is an Albanian masculine given name. It is a combination of Albanian words: erë (wind) and mirë (good). Notable people with the name include:
 Ermir Dobjani (born 1953), Albanian lawyer
 Ermir Lenjani (born 1989), Albanian footballer
 Ermir Rezi (born 1994), Albanian footballer
 Ermir Strati (born 1983), Albanian footballer

References

Albanian masculine given names